PTT (Postes, Télégraphes et Téléphones), divided since 1991 between France Télécom and La Poste,  also known as P&T and P et T, was the French administration of postal services and telecommunications, formed in 1921.

The company rolled out Minitel, a Videotex online service accessible through telephone lines, experimentally between July 1980 in Saint-Malo, France, and from autumn 1980 in other areas, and introduced it commercially throughout France in 1982. Minitel was the world's most successful online service prior to the World Wide Web.

The name Postes, Télécommunication et Télédiffusion never received official recognition from the French state.  It was above all used in French campaigns, in unofficial texts and in film credits.  In effect, Télédiffusion, which grouped together television and radio channels, was always independent.

References

Government-owned companies of France
France
Telecommunications companies of France
Telecommunications companies established in 1921
Government agencies established in 1921
Government agencies disestablished in 1991
French companies disestablished in 1991
French companies established in 1921